Queen Gyeongsu (경수왕후) (fl. 780), also known as Lady Manwol (만월부인), was the queen regent of Silla between 765 and 780.  

She was the second consort of king Gyeongdeok of Silla and the mother of king Hyegong of Silla, and ruled during his minority. In 768, she received title of queen mother sent from the Tang Emperor as a diplomatic gift to her son. The queen mother regent was however not able to control the unstable political situation. In 780, her son and his queen consort were killed during a rebellion. It is not documented what happened to the king's mother and regent.

References

8th-century women rulers
8th-century Korean women
Korean queens consort
Year of birth unknown
Year of death unknown